In graph theory, a knight's graph, or a knight's tour graph, is a graph that represents all legal moves of the knight chess piece on a chessboard. Each vertex of this graph represents a square of the chessboard, and each edge connects two squares that are a knight's move apart from each other.
More specifically, an  knight's graph is a knight's graph of an  chessboard.

A Hamiltonian cycle on the knight's graph is a (closed) knight's tour. A chessboard with an odd number of squares has no tour, because the knight's graph is a bipartite graph (each color of squares can be used as one of two independent sets, and knight moves always change square color) and only bipartite graphs with an even number of vertices can have Hamiltonian cycles. All but finitely many chessboards with an even number of squares have a knight's tour; Schwenk's theorem provides an exact listing of which ones do and which do not.

When it is modified to have toroidal boundary conditions (meaning that a knight is not blocked by the edge of the board, but instead continues onto the opposite edge) the  knight's graph is the same as the four-dimensional hypercube graph.

See also
 King's graph
 Queen's graph
 Rook's graph
 Bishop's graph

References

External links

Mathematical chess problems
Parametric families of graphs